The Juodkiškiai Reservoir is an artificial lake in Kėdainiai District Municipality, central Lithuania. It was created in 1980, when a dam on the Obelis river had been built next to Juodkiškiai hamlet. In 1995, the dam was reconstructed and a small hydroelectric plant (of 510 kW) has been built. 
 
Shores of the reservoir are low, agriculture lands stretch around the lake. The Bubliai Reservoir and some smaller reservoirs (the Koliupė Reservoir, the Malčius Reservoir) empty into the Juodkiškiai Reservoir. The A8 highway crosses the lake.

References

Lakes of Kėdainiai District Municipality
Reservoirs in Lithuania